Armenia Balducci (13 March 1933 – 29 July 2022) was an Italian actress, screenwriter and director.

Biography 
Balducci was elected Miss Testaccio and had a short acting career, acting under the pseudonym Bella Visconti, which spanned six films between 1953 and 1956; it was only in 1971 that she returned in front of the cameras for an appearance in Sacco & Vanzetti. She also acted in theater; she was politically active in various left-wing parties (along with her long-time partner Gian Maria Volonté) and was twice Elio Petri's editorial secretary. In 1978 and 1980 she directed two films that took a critical or satirical look at the bourgeoisie and its police representatives, but they were financial failures. From 1986 to 1993 and again in 2002 she worked as a screenwriter for Giuseppe Ferrara's films. In the latter year, her film La rivincita, shot digitally, premiered at the Tierra di Siena Film Festival.

Filmography

As actress 
Easy Years (1953)
A Day in Court (1954)
Of Life and Love (1954)
The Art of Getting Along (1954)
Girls of Today (1955)
Time of Vacation (1956)
Sacco & Vanzetti (1971)

As director 
Together? (1979)
Stark System (1980)
La rivincita (2002)

As screenwriter 
Together? (1979)
Stark System (1980)
The Moro Affair (1986)
Narcos (1992)
Giovanni Falcone (1993)
The Bankers of God: The Calvi Affair (2002)

References

External links 

1933 births
2022 deaths
20th-century Italian actresses
Italian film actresses
Italian stage actresses
Italian women film directors
Italian women screenwriters
Actresses from Rome